Roje pri Trebelnem is a settlement in the hills south of Trebelno in the Municipality of Mokronog-Trebelno in southeastern Slovenia. It lies in the valley of Radulja Creek and its territory extends south to include most of the northern slopes of Radulja Hill. The area is part of the historical region of Lower Carniola. The municipality is now included in the Southeast Slovenia Statistical Region.

Name
The name of the settlement was changed from Roje to Roje pri Trebelnem in 1953.

References

External links
Roje pri Trebelnem on Geopedia

Populated places in the Municipality of Mokronog-Trebelno